Erik Lindgren (15 December 1954) is an American composer and pianist. He runs Arf! Arf! Records, and has led or been a member of several ensembles such as The Space Negros and Birdsongs of the Mesozoic.

Early life
Lindgren was born in Harrisburg, Pennsylvania in December 1954. He attended Northfield Mount Hermon School from 1969–1972 studying music with Joseph T. Elliott III, and received his BA in Music from Tufts University in 1976 where he worked with T. J. Anderson. In 1974–1975 he spent his junior year abroad in London studying composition at the Guildhall School of Music with Alfred Nieman and piano with Birgette Wild. Lindgren received an MA in music composition and piano performance from the University of Iowa in 1977 where he studied with Donald Jenni, Richard Hervig and Peter Lewis.

Career
As a contemporary classical composer, Lindgren has a catalog of over seven dozen works, ranging from solo piano pieces to chamber music to orchestral works. He also owns Foot Foot Music BMI which publishes all of his original compositions. In 1978, Lindgren established Sounds Interesting Productions, a commercial recording studio and music production company based in Cambridge, MA. In 1998, he relocated his facility to Middleborough, MA. National and regional credits include original scores for ABC, NBC CBS and PBS, Eastpak, Boston Globe, Basketball Hall of Fame, Jordan Marsh, Polaroid, Prentice Hall and the Christmas Tree Shops. Lindgren also markets The Well-Tempered Music Library that consists of seven CDs of stock commercial music that he composed and produced.

Lindgren was a founding member of the new music ensemble Birdsongs of the Mesozoic that Billboard Magazine described as “a mesmerizing venture into the space age jungle.” The quartet has toured extensively throughout the United States and Canada and held residencies at Dartmouth College, Emory University, Duke, UNCA and the Massachusetts College of Art. Birdsongs’ has recorded for the Rykodisc, Cuneiform and Ace of Hearts labels. The group has collaborated with Duplex Planet editor/National Public Radio correspondent David Greenberger on 1001 Real Apes" (2006), and with Atlanta bass baritone Oral Moses on "Extreme Spirituals" (2006).

The composer celebrated his 50th Birthday performing original works live with various ensembles at The Longy School of Music, Pickman Hall, Cambridge, MA (June 4, 2005).

In 2012, Lindgren received a commission from the Georgia Symphony Orchestra to compose "Extreme Spirituals," a 6-movement 25-minute work for orchestra and bass baritone soloist. The performances featured Oral Moses, whom Lindgren has produced a half-dozen solo CDs for the Albany record label. "Extreme Spirituals" was performed by the Brockton Symphony Orchestra in April 2017 which included Oral Moses once again as the soloist.

In September 2015, Lindgren celebrated his 60th birthday as an artist-in-residence at his alma mater Tufts University in Medford MA. Culminating the week-long residency was a concert devoted to his original chamber works composed during the past decade.

Arf! Arf! Records/SFZ Recordings
For over twenty years, Lindgren has run the Arf! Arf! label which has released over seventy archival CDs documenting 1960s garage/psychedelic rock and "outsider" music. Arf! Arf! issued four CD retrospectives by Lindgren's 1980s experimental studio group The Space Negros. He has also produced over 100 records for artists as Willie Loco Alexander, the Rising Storm, The Turbines, The Cynics, Magic Mose & his Royal Rockers, featuring 'Blind Sam,' Ed “Moose” Savage And His Litany Of Complaints, and harmonica virtuoso Richard Hunter.

In addition, Lindgren runs the SFZ Recordings label which issued his 1999 release Erik Lindgren Scores (SFZ-001) containing acoustic chamber works with ambient visuals, and the 2006 release by the Frankenstein Consort Classical A-Go-Go (SFZ-004) containing original music for woodwind trio, piano, and percussion by one of his performing ensembles.

In 2014, a comprehensive two-CD, 50-track retrospective, Yin Yang A-Go-Go [1972-2005] (Arf Arf AA-105/106) was released in conjunction with Lindgren's 60th birthday.

In 2016, Lindgren's third solo CD Bespoke'' (Albany Troy 1632) was released containing recent original acoustic chamber works.

References

1954 births
Tufts University alumni
University of Iowa alumni
Dartmouth College faculty
Emory University faculty
Duke University faculty
Massachusetts College of Art and Design faculty
American male composers
American male pianists
American keyboardists
Musicians from Massachusetts
Record producers from Massachusetts
American music industry executives
Businesspeople from Massachusetts
American company founders
21st-century American composers
Alumni of the Guildhall School of Music and Drama
Living people
Northfield Mount Hermon School alumni
21st-century American male musicians